The 1997 World Rowing Championships were World Rowing Championships that were held from 31 August to 7 September 1997 at Lac d'Aiguebelette, France. The annual week-long rowing regatta was organized by FISA (the International Rowing Federation), and held at the end of the northern hemisphere summer. In non-Olympic years it is the highlight of the international rowing calendar.

Medal summary

Men's events

Women's events

Medal table

References

External links
 Results on World Rowing website

World Rowing Championships, 1997
World Rowing Championships
World
World Rowing Championships, 1997
Rowing
Rowing
Rowing